Lodovico Castelvetro (ca. 1505–1571) was an important figure in the development of neo-classicism, especially in drama. It was his reading of Aristotle that led to a widespread adoption of a tight version of the Three Unities, as a dramatic standard.

Castelvetro was born in Modena, Italy, and died in Chiavenna.

Works
His Poetica d'Aristotele vulgarizzata e sposta ("The Poetics of Aristotle translated in the Vulgar Language and commented on") was called the most famous Italian Renaissance commentary on Aristotle's Poetics.

The Roman inquisition became a force in Modena during the papacy of Pope Paul IV, who opposed the softer policy exercised by Bishop Foscari and his patron, Cardinal Giovanni Morone. Foscari had not favored the persecution of individuals like Gadaldino; Bonifacio and Filippo Valentini; and Castelvetro.  The latter's supposed involvement in translation of Protestant texts caused him trouble with the Church. He was labelled a heretic in 1557, and by 1560 had left Modena, and lived in exile from his native Italy (he was born near Modena). His Giunta, a commentary on the Prose della volgar lingua by Pietro Bembo, is one of the earlier texts on Italian grammar, and linguistics in general; his contemporaries objected to him that his theories were a little too philosophical for their time.

References

 Andrew Bongiorno (editor and translator), Castelvetro on the Art of Poetry (1984)
 Stefano Jossa, ‘Ludovico Castelvetro between Humanism and Heresy’, in F. De Donno, S. Gilson (eds), Beyond Catholicism : Heresy, Mysticism, and Apocalypse in Italian Culture (New York: Palgrave/Macmillan, 2014), pp. 77–103.

External links
 

Italian literary critics
Italian male writers
Year of birth uncertain
People from Modena
People convicted of heresy
Victims of the Inquisition
1500s births
1571 deaths